A muffin is an individually portioned baked product, however the term can refer to one of two distinct items: a part-raised flatbread (like a crumpet) that is baked and then cooked on a griddle (typically unsweetened), or a (often sweetened) quickbread that is chemically leavened and then baked in a mold. While quickbread "American" muffins are often sweetened, there are savory varieties made with ingredients such as corn and cheese, and less sweet varieties like traditional bran muffins. The flatbread "English" variety is of British or other European derivation, and dates from at least the early 18th century, while the quickbread originated in North America during the 19th century. Both types are common worldwide today.

Etymology 
One 19th century source suggests that "muffin" may be related to the Greek bread "maphula", a "cake baked on a hearth or griddle", or from Old French "mou-pain" ("soft bread"), which may have been corrupted into "mouffin". The word is first found in print in 1703, spelled moofin; it is of uncertain origin but possibly derived from the Low German Muffen, the plural of Muffe meaning a small cake, or possibly with some connection to the Old French moufflet meaning soft, as said of bread. The expression "muffin-man", meaning a street seller of muffins, is attested in a 1754 poem, which includes the line: "Hark! the shrill Muffin-Man his Carol plies.."

Quickbread muffins

Quickbread muffins (sometimes described in Britain as "American muffins") are baked, individual-sized, cupcake-shaped foods with a "moist, coarse-grained" texture. Muffins are available in both savoury varieties, such as cornmeal and cheese muffins, or sweet varieties such as blueberry, chocolate chip, lemon or banana flavours. Sweetened muffins range from lightly sweetened muffins to products that are "richer than many cakes in fat and sugar." They are similar to cupcakes in size and cooking methods, the main difference being that cupcakes tend to be sweet desserts using cake batter and which are often topped with sugar icing (American frosting). Muffins may have solid items mixed into the batter, such as berries, chocolate chips or nuts. Fresh baked muffins are sold by bakeries, donut shops and some fast food restaurants and coffeehouses. Factory baked muffins are sold at grocery stores and convenience stores and are also served in some coffeeshops and cafeterias.

History
The use of the term to describe what are essentially cupcakes or buns did not become common usage in Britain until the last decades of the 20th century on the back of the spread of coffee shops such as Starbucks. Recipes for quickbread muffins are common in 19th-century American cookbooks. Recipes for yeast-based muffins, which were sometimes called "common muffins" or "wheat muffins" in 19th-century American cookbooks, can be found in much older cookbooks. In Fannie Farmer's Boston Cooking-School Cook Book, she gave recipes for both types of muffins, both those that used yeast to raise the dough and those that used a quick bread method, using muffin rings to shape the English muffins. Farmer indicated that stove top "baking", as is done with yeast dough, was a useful method when baking in an oven was not practical. Over the years, the size and calorie content of muffins has changed: the "3-inch muffins grandmother made had only 120 to 160 calories. But today’s giant bakery muffins contain from 340 to 630 calories each."

Manufacture
Quickbread muffins are made with flour, sieved together with bicarbonate of soda as a raising agent. To this is added butter or shortening, eggs and any flavourings (fruit, such as blueberries, chocolate or banana; or savouries, such as cheese).

Commercial muffins may have "modified starches", corn syrup (or high-fructose corn syrup), xanthan gum, or guar gum to increase moisture content and lengthen shelf life (as well, these gums can make added solids, such as chocolate chips, disperse more evenly in the batter).

Bran muffins 

Bran muffins use less flour and use bran instead, as well as using molasses and brown sugar. The mix is turned into a pocketed muffin tray, or into individual paper moulds, and baked in an oven. Milk is often added, as it contributes to the appealing browning appearance. The result are raised, individual quickbreads. The muffin may have toppings added, such as cinnamon sugar, streusel, nuts, or chocolate chips.

Poppyseed muffins

Poppyseed muffins (or poppy seed muffins) contain poppy seeds. Poppy seeds were already popular in most parts of the world for their taste and texture—as well as the narcotic characteristics of the opium poppy plant they are harvested from. In modern times, growing poppy seeds is a difficult business for American farmers, due to the risk of heroin production. Other countries have fewer difficulties with permitting the growth of poppies for the seeds alone, which have very low (but still present) levels of opium alkaloids, such as morphine. As other countries began imitating the American muffin, the occasional use of poppy seeds to flavor them spread as well. Although poppy seeds cannot be used as a narcotic due to very low levels of opium alkaloids, they do have enough that drug tests are often fooled and give out false positives after an otherwise drug-free person consumes just a few poppyseed muffins. Because of this, all poppyseed pastries place the person who consumes them prior to a test at a high risk of being inaccurately considered a drug user.

Nutrition
Harvard University's Nutrition Source states that while many fruit muffins may seem "...to be a better breakfast than their donut neighbors" at your local coffeeshop, with their ' "...often refined flours, high sodium, and plenty of added sugar...and large portion size, they’re far from the optimal food choice to start your day." Consumers think that commercial muffins are a healthier choice than donuts; however, according to Registered Dietician Karen Collins, yeast or raised donuts have from 170 to 270 calories each (cake doughnuts have from 290 to 360 calories), while large bakery muffins have from 340 to 630 calories each and 11 to 27 grams of total fat. "Most muffins are deceptively high in fats", with up to 40% fat content, which many consumers are not aware of.

The type of muffin can have a big impact on its fat and sugar content; one major fast food chain's low-fat berry muffin has 300 calories, whereas the same restaurant's chocolate chunk muffin has 620 calories. Harvard's Nutrition Source recommends smaller-sized, whole-grain muffins with reduced sugar content, liquid plant oil instead of shortening or butter, and added wholesome foods such as nuts (or nut flour) or beans (or bean flour) or fresh fruit or vegetables.

Muffin tops 

The muffin top is the crisp upper part of the muffin, which has developed a "browned crust that's slightly singed around the edges". They were the focus of a 1997 Seinfeld sitcom episode, "The Muffin Tops" (episode 21 of season 8), where the character Elaine, who only eats the tops when she buys a muffin, realizes that a bakery selling just the tops could be successful. Once the business is running, she has to figure out what to do with the muffin bottoms, which proves difficult.

In 2018, McDonald's restaurant announced they were planning to sell muffin tops as part of their McCafe breakfast menu.

Bakeware and baking aids

Muffin tins and muffin pans are typically metal bakeware which has round bowl-shaped depressions into which muffin batter is poured. Muffin tins or pans can be greased with butter or cooking spray, to lessen the issue of batter sticking to the pan. Alternatively, muffin cups or cases are used. Cups or cases are usually round sheets of paper, foil, or silicone with scallop-pressed edges, giving the muffin a round cup shape. They are used in the baking of muffins to line the bottoms of muffin tins, to facilitate the easy removal of the finished muffin from the tin. The advantage to cooks is easier removal and cleanup, more precise form, and moister muffins; however, using them will prevent a crust from forming.

A variety of sizes for muffin cases are available. Slightly different sizes are considered "standard" in different countries. Some jumbo-size cases can hold more than twice the size of standard cases. Australian and Swedish bakers are accustomed to taller paper cases with a larger diameter at the top than American and British bakers.

Gallery of quickbread muffin flavors

Flatbread muffins

It is of English or European origin. Rather than being entirely oven-baked, they are also cooked in a griddle on the stove top and flipped from side-to-side, which results in their typical flattened shape rather than the rounded top seen in baked rolls or cake-type muffins. "Cornmeal and bran are sometimes substituted for some of the flour." These muffins are popular in Commonwealth countries and the United States. Flatbread muffins are often served toasted for breakfast. They may be served with butter or margarine, and topped with sweet toppings, such as jam or honey, or savoury toppings (e.g., round sausage, cooked egg, cheese or bacon). Flatbread muffins are often eaten as a breakfast food (e.g. as an essential ingredient in Eggs Benedict and most of its variations), accompanied by coffee or tea.

History

English muffins were first mentioned in literature in the early 18th century, although the product is undoubtedly older than that. In the Oxford Companion to Food, Alan Davidson states that "[t]here has always been some confusion between muffins, crumpets, and pikelets, both in recipes and in name." The increasing popularity of flatbread muffins in the 19th century, is attested by the existence of "...muffin men [who] traversed the town streets at teatime, ringing their bells" to sell them. The bell-ringing of muffin men became so common that by the 1840s, the British Parliament passed a law to prohibit bell ringing by muffin men, but it was not adhered to by sellers.

"Mush muffins (called slipperdowns in New England) were a Colonial [American] muffin made with hominy on a hanging griddle." Theses and other types of flatbread muffins were known to American settlers, but they declined in popularity with the advent of the quickbread muffin. The English muffin was re-introduced to the American market in 1880 as "English muffins" by English-American baker Samuel Beth Thomas (whose baked-goods company Thomas survives to this day). Thomas called the product "toaster crumpets", and intended them as a "more elegant alternative to toast' to be served in fine hotels. The English muffin has been described as a variant form of a crumpet, or a "cousin", with the difference being the location of the holes; in a crumpet, the holes go all the way to the top, whereas with an English muffin, the holes are inside. In 1910, Fred Wolferman of Kansas City, Missouri began making denser English muffins at his family grocery, using empty tin cans as molds.

Bakeware
Muffin rings are metal cookware used for oven-baking or griddle-cooking flatbread muffins. They are circle-shaped objects made of thin metal. The rings are about one inch high.

A Muffineer was originally a sugar shaker, looking like a large salt cellar with a perforated decorative top, for spreading powdered sugar on muffins and other sweet cakes. Later, in the 19th century, the term was also used to describe a silver, or silver-plated, muffin dish, with a domed lid and a compartment below for hot water, used to keep toasted English muffins warm before serving.

In popular culture
"The Muffin Man" is a traditional nursery rhyme, children's song or children's game of English origin from 1820.

A well-known reference to English muffins is in Oscar Wilde's 1895 play The Importance of Being Earnest.

As symbols
Note: these are American muffins
The corn muffin is the official state muffin of Massachusetts.
 The blueberry muffin is the official state muffin of Minnesota.
 The apple muffin is the official state muffin of New York.

See also
 
 American cuisine
 Breakfast foods
Croissant
 Cruffin
Crumpet
 Cupcake
 Dessert
Donut
 Jiffy mix
 List of baked goods
 Mantecadas
The Muffin Man
Scone

References

American breads
British breads
Quick breads
Sweet breads
Snack foods